Gyles House is an historic building in Pittenweem, Fife, Scotland. Dating to 1626, it is a Category A listed building. It was formerly a sea captain's house.

See also
 List of listed buildings in Pittenweem, Fife
 List of Category A listed buildings in Fife

References

Category A listed buildings in Fife
Houses in Fife
Listed buildings in Pittenweem
1626 establishments in Scotland